This list comprises all players who have participated in at least one league match for Cincinnati Kings since the team's first season in the USL in 2005. Players who were on the roster but never played a first team game are not listed; players who appeared for the team in other competitions (US Open Cup, etc.) but never actually made a USL appearance are noted at the bottom of the page where appropriate.

A
  Josh Albers
  D. J. Albert
  Trey Alexander
  Paul Andrews
  Aaron Arndt
  Eric Ashworth

B
  Peter Baah
  Matt Bahner
  Bradley Barraclough
  Josh Barton
  Rahman Batanovic
  Patrick Baxter
  Steven Beattie
  Ivan Becerra
  Braden Bishop
  Clifton Brown
  Tim Brown
  Andy Burke
  Jon Burklo
  Shane Michael Burt

C
  Jon Caldwell
  Tony Capurro
  Simon Carey
  Mesac Celeste
  Romain Cheurlin
  Tommy Clines
  Paul Cox
  Jack Cummings
  Jimmy Cummings

D
  Moussa Dagnogo
  William Davis
  Aaron Denney
  Andy Dimbi
  Stephen Doran
  Dustin Downey
  François Dubourdeau

E
  Drew Eby
  Seth Eckerlin

F
  Salvator Fiore
  Michael Flynn
  Justin Fox

G
  James Getzen
  Matt Gibson
  Albert Gross

H
  Thies Hermann
  Ross Hopkins
  Jeff Hughes

J
  Nowaf Jaman
  Jordan James
  Justin Jarvis
  Justin Jenkins
  Eric Jones

K
  Bryan Kanu
  Steven Kehoe
  Suleiman Khan
  George Kithas
  Mark Konitsch
  Phillip Koshi
  John Krause

L
  Ruben Lagunas
  John Liersemann
  Jasmin Lizdo
  Kyle Long
  David Lopez-Cepero
  Abdul Lubega

M
  Gavin MacLeod
  Jonathan Madden
  Marcel Matis
  Kevin McCloskey
  John McGinlay
  Mike McGinlay
  Aaron McKenna
  Judson McKinney
  John Mellencamp
  Nathan Micklos
  Drew Midkiff
  Aaron Miller
  Samuel Miller
  Andrew Montgomery
  Richard Moodie
  Ben Murray

N
  Bryon Neal
  Kevin Noschang

O
  Blake Ordell

P
  Charlie Pettys
  Jon Pickup

R
  Florent Rainy
  Tony Ray
  Craig Rhodis
  Jarrett Robbins
  Justin Robbins
  Adam Ross

S
  Craig Salvati
  Kwame Sarkodie
  Brian Schaeper
  Wes Schulte
  Kyle Segebart
  Jonathan Shaw
  Jamal Shteiwi
  Bradley Simpson
  Jake Slemker
  Derek Smith
  Travis Sobers
  Tiest Sondaal
  Branden Stelmak
  Jonathan Sutton

T
  C.J. Tappel
  Ben Thomas
  Ashleigh Townsend

V
  Alex Van der Sluijs
  Zach Van Frank
  Jake Vollmer

W
  Tristan Watson
  Nick Weightman
  Corey Whisenhunt
  Jonathan Williams
  Matt Williams

Sources

2010 Cincinnati Kings stats
2009 Cincinnati Kings stats
2008 Cincinnati Kings stats
2007 Cincinnati Kings stats
2006 Cincinnati Kings stats
2005 Cincinnati Kings stats

References

Cincinnati Kings
 
Association football player non-biographical articles